Arrup is a genus of centipedes in the family Mecistocephalidae, native to Europe and Asia as far as Japan. These centipedes range from 1 cm to 5 cm in length. All species in this genus have 41 leg-bearing segments. Most are soil-dwellers but Arrup akiyoshiensis is a troglobiont.

Species 
Currently accepted species include:
Arrup akiyoshiensis Tsukamoto & Shimano, 2019
Arrup areolatus Shinohara, 1957
Arrup asiaticus Titova, 1975
Arrup dentatus Takakuwa, 1934
Arrup doii Takakuwa, 1940
Arrup edentulus Attems, 1904
Arrup holstii Pocock R.I., 1895
Arrup ishiianus Uliana, Bonato & Minelli, 2007-22
Arrup kyushuensis Uliana, Bonato & Minelli, 2007-22
Arrup lilliputianus Uliana, Bonato & Minelli, 2007-22
Arrup longicalix Uliana, Bonato & Minelli, 2007-22
Arrup mamaevi Titova, 1975
Arrup obtusus Takakuwa, 1934
Arrup pauroporus Y.Takakuwa, 1936
Arrup pylorus Chamberlin, 1912
Arrup sauteri Silvestri, 1919

References 

Geophilomorpha